Bertkauia crosbyana is a species of elliptical barklouse in the family Epipsocidae. It is found in Central America and North America.

References

 Lienhard, Charles, and Courtenay N. Smithers (2002). "Psocoptera (Insecta): World Catalogue and Bibliography". Instrumenta Biodiversitatis, vol. 5, xli + 745.

Further reading

 

Epipsocidae